Lesbian, gay, bisexual, and transgender (LGBT) people in Pará, Brazil enjoy many of the same legal protections available to non-LGBT people. Homosexuality is legal in the state.

Recognition of same-sex unions
On June 28, 2012, in the state of Pará, 28 same-sex couples got married in a ceremony, that took place in Belém.

LGBT adoption
December 21, 2011 - the Justice of the city of Belém, Pará authorized the adoption of a two-year-old child by a lesbian couple.

References

Para
Pará